Frank Chan Fan  (born 4 February 1958) is a Hong Kong engineer and government official. He served as Secretary for Transport and Housing from 2017 to 2022, also the Chairman of Hong Kong Housing Authority, Chairman of Aviation Development & Three-runway System Advisory Committee and Chairman of Hong Kong Logistics Development Council. Before Chan has become a principal official as Secretary for Transport and Housing, he was the Director of Electrical and Mechanical Services.

Biography
Chan received his bachelor's degree in engineering from the University of Hong Kong, master's degree in medical physics from the University of Aberdeen, UK, and master's degree in business management from the University of Hong Kong.

He joined the Government as an Assistant Electronics Engineer in August 1982. He was promoted to Chief Electronics Engineer in February 2001 and to Government Electrical and Mechanical Engineer in May 2005. He was appointed Deputy Director of Electrical and Mechanical Services in January 2009. He became Director of Electrical and Mechanical Services in 2011. He is the Secretary for Transport and Housing since 2017.

As the Secretary for Transport and Housing, Mr Chan is the Chairman of the Hong Kong Housing Authority, Hong Kong Maritime and Port Board, Hong Kong Logistics Development Council and Aviation Development and Three-runway System Advisory Committee. He is also board member of MTR Corporation Limited, Airport Authority Hong Kong and Hong Kong Mortgage Corporation; as well as member of the Council for Sustainable Development and Economic Development Commission.

In 2018, Chan claimed that the Guangzhou-Shenzhen-Hong Kong Express Rail Link would be profitable since opening day.

In 2021, Chan said that it might take 20 years to substantially reduce the average waiting time of 5.8 years for public housing.

References

1958 births
Living people
Alumni of the University of Aberdeen
Alumni of the University of Hong Kong
Delegates to the 14th National People's Congress from Hong Kong
Government officials of Hong Kong
Hong Kong civil servants
Hong Kong engineers
Members of the Executive Council of Hong Kong
People from Zhanjiang
Recipients of the Gold Bauhinia Star